This is a list of the Spanish Singles number-ones of 1974.

Chart history

See also
1974 in music
List of number-one hits (Spain)

References

1974
Spain Singles
Number-one singles